Mutsuo (written: 六夫, 睦郎 or 睦夫) is a masculine Japanese given name. Notable people with the name include:

 (1935–2005),  Japanese baseball pitcher
 (1918–1986), Japanese engineer 
 (born 1943), Japanese judge
 (1913–1943), Japanese sprinter
 (born 1937), Japanese poet and writer
 (1917-1938), perpetrator of the Tsuyama massacre
 (born 1957), Japanese sumo wrestler

Japanese masculine given names